Horace Brown (born in Hartford, Connecticut) is an American R&B singer. He is the son of an Apostolic minister.

Life and career
Brown played a variety of instruments in his school's marching band and got a break when DeVante Swing of Jodeci heard one of his demos. He then earned spots doing background vocals for Christopher Williams and some writing and producing (Terri & Monica's Systa album). He then managed to get a recording contract with Uptown Records after president Andre Harrell saw him in a recording session.

In 1994, while with Uptown Records he record his first album, Brown spurred controversy when his single "Taste Your Love" was released. The single was an ode to oral sex and was banned in parts of the South. Despite the press around the single, it failed to perform well on the charts. One more single ("Let Me Know") was released as a promotional 12", but was cancelled as his Uptown Records album was shelved.

When Andre Harrell of Uptown moved to Motown, he brought Brown with him. Motown promoted Brown by releasing two more singles ("One for the Money" and "Things We Do for Love") and in 1996, released his self-titled debut album. The album featured Sean "Puffy" Combs and remixes featured Foxy Brown and Jay-Z. The album's final single was "How Can We Stop" featuring Faith Evans, although three more songs ("Why Why Why", "I Want You Baby" and "Trippin") were released as promotional 12" singles.

Since the release of his debut album, Brown has done a couple of collaborations with artists such as Naudy, Mr. Cheeks, Lisha, Royal Flush and PrinZe Gabriel.

In 2000, he released a single "Shake It Up" on the international label Double H Production with Cut Killer. The following year, he released another single "This Is the One" on Money Talks Entertainment with rapper Styles P.

As of 2013, he toured overseas with Keith Sweat and other R&B artists. He has also joined the upcoming reality series, Come Back Kings,  with Ed Lover, Calvin Richardson, David "Davinch" Chance (of Ruff Endz), Jeff Sanders, Jameio, Mr. Cheeks and Black Rob.

Discography

Albums

Singles

Collaborations
"This Christmas" (with missjones) (1994)
"Party Naughty" (with Naudy) (1998)
"Friday Night" (with Mr. Cheeks) (2001)
"I Want That" (with Lisha) (2007)
"Never Should've" (with Royal Flush) (2008)
"Rock the Party" (with PrinZe Gabriel) (2013)

References

External links
Horace Brown bio
Official Myspace

Living people
21st-century African-American male singers
Singers from Connecticut
American contemporary R&B singers
Motown artists
Year of birth missing (living people)